Ischnia is a genus of longhorn beetles of the subfamily Lamiinae, containing the following species:

 Ischnia aurescens Breuning, 1969
 Ischnia mirei Breuning, 1973
 Ischnia okuensis Breuning, 1973
 Ischnia picta Jordan, 1903

References

Pteropliini